Mount Archibald is a prominent  mountain summit located in the Kluane Ranges of the Saint Elias Mountains in Yukon, Canada. Set on the boundary line of Kluane National Park, Archibald can be seen from the Alaska Highway, weather permitting. The mountain was named after Edgar Archibald (1885-1968), a Canadian agricultural scientist. The mountain's name was officially adopted August 12, 1980, by the Geographical Names Board of Canada. On a clear day, the summit offers views deep into Kluane National Park of giants such as Mt. Logan, Mt. Vancouver, and Mt. Kennedy.

Climate

Based on the Köppen climate classification, Mount Archibald is located in a subarctic climate zone with long, cold, snowy winters, and mild summers.  The annual average temperature in the neighborhood is -6 ° C. The warmest month is July, when the average temperature is 8 °C, and the coldest is December when temperatures can drop below −20 °C with wind chill factors below −30 °C. Precipitation runoff from the peak and meltwater from its surrounding glaciers drains into tributaries of the Alsek River.

See also

List of mountains of Canada
Geography of Yukon

References

External links
 Parks Canada: Kluane National Park
 Weather forecast: Mount Archibald
 Climbing Mt. Archibald: yukonhiking.ca 

Two-thousanders of Yukon
Saint Elias Mountains
Kluane National Park and Reserve